The Indonesia–Papua New Guinea border is the international border between Indonesia and Papua New Guinea. The border, which divides the island of New Guinea in half, consists of two straight north–south lines connected by a short section running along the Fly river, totalling 824 km (512 mi). The boundary separates Papua, Highland Papua, and South Papua provinces of Indonesia from Sandaun and Western provinces of Papua New Guinea.

Description
The border starts in the north at northern coast of New Guinea, immediately west of the Papuan village of Wutung and Mount Bougainville. It then proceeds in a straight vertical line to the south along the 141st meridian east, cutting across the Oenake Range, the Kohari Hills, the Bewani Mountains, the Border Mountains and the Central Highlands. Upon reaching the Fly River it then follows this in a C-shaped curve, before continuing in a N-S line at 141º 01'10" meridian east, cutting across the Kai Lagoon, down to the estuary of the Bensbach River with the Torres Strait on the southern coast of New Guinea.

History

The Netherlands began colonising the area of modern Indonesia (then called the Dutch East Indies) in the 17th century, and extended their rule eastwards. In 1828 they claimed the north-west coast of New Guinea as far as the 140th meridian east in 1828, as part of the traditional lands of the Sultan of Tidore. In 1884 the north-eastern quarter of New Guinea was claimed by Germany and the south-eastern quarter by Britain, with the two agreeing a border between their respective territories the following year. In 1895 Britain and the Netherlands signed a border treaty which delimited their common boundary on the island at its current location.

British New Guinea was renamed the Territory of Papua in 1905 and given to Australia the following year. Following the defeat of Germany in the First World War it was stripped of its colonies, with German New Guinea given to Britain in 1920 and then united with Papua in 1949 as the Territory of Papua and New Guinea. Indonesia gained recognized independence in 1949, however Dutch New Guinea was kept under Dutch rule owing to its unique character, sparking a dispute with Indonesia, which claimed the territory. The territory was later transferred to Indonesia in 1963, with some locals opposed to Indonesian rule and began an insurgency that continues today. In 1973 the eastern half of the island was renamed Papua New Guinea and gained independence in 1975. The border was based on an Australian-Indonesia treaty signed on 13 February 1973 which fixed the border at its current position.

Tensions between Indonesia and Papua New Guinea grew, as the ongoing West Papuan conflict destabilised the border region, causing flows of refugees and cross-border incursions by Indonesia's military. In 1986 a friendship treaty between the two countries was signed, by which both sides agreed to settle any issues they had peacefully. The treaty was renewed in 1990.

In 2020, due to the COVID-19 pandemic, the border was officially closed, but in practice people continued to pass through the porous borders. It was reopened in September 2021, but then was once more closed by November.

Border crossings

There is currently just one binational, official crossing point, between Jayapura (Indonesia, at Skouw) and Vanimo (Papua New Guinea). However Indonesia had established another border post in Waris, Keerom Regency, Sota and Torasi, Merauke Regency, as well as a border post in construction in Yetetkun, Boven Digoel Regency.

See also
 Indonesia–Papua New Guinea relations

References

 
border
Borders of Indonesia
International borders